is a Japanese retired track and field sprinter who specialized in the 200 metres. He competed at the 2001 World Championships, the 2003 World Championships and the 2004 Olympic Games.

Personal bests

International competition

References

External links

Ryo Matsuda at JAAF  (archived)
Ryo Matsuda at JOC 

1979 births
Living people
Japanese male sprinters
Sportspeople from Hiroshima
Olympic athletes of Japan
Athletes (track and field) at the 2004 Summer Olympics
World Athletics Championships athletes for Japan
21st-century Japanese people